Bugaboo Creek Steakhouse (stylized as BUGABOO CREEK STEAK HOUSE) was a Canadian-themed U.S. casual dining restaurant chain, serving American cuisine, based in East Providence, Rhode Island. The restaurant first opened in October 1992 in Warwick, Rhode Island. Up until the mid 2010s, it was known for several novel animatronics based on the wildlife of Canada. Animatronics of bulls, buffaloes, or moose trophy head mounts would greet guests and provide entertainment. Other novelty characters such as Timber, The Talking Christmas Tree, would be programmed to tell customers about Canadian history and natural attractions.

Menu
The menu offered classic steakhouse offerings. Some menu items included steak, burgers, salads, desserts, appetizers, breakfast food (mornings only), seafood, sandwiches, pasta, and other bar food.

Bankruptcy and closure
In November 2010, Praesidian Capital announced that it filed for Chapter 11 bankruptcy and closed most of its Massachusetts locations. At the time of the announcement, the company had 12 restaurants still in operation after closing 18 restaurants the previous week. Following the bankruptcy, the chain began moving away from the talking animals, shutting down their animatronics while still leaving them up on the walls. On June 29, 2016, the chain completely closed its doors worldwide.

Animatronics 
From the time of the chain's opening until the bankruptcy, Bugaboo Creek was known for its novelty animatronics. Among the real mounts of bucks, deer and bears, several recreated mounts would be fitted with robotics to talk and move. Depending on the location, moose or buffalo mounts would be near the dining tables or at the bar, whereas a constant Bill the Buffalo would watch over the customers coming into the dining room. The characters would break the fourth wall, sardonically referencing their status as perpetually trapped robots, hanging above the guests, who were happily enjoying their meals. Local restaurants would name these animatronics, such as Moxie the Moose or Goose the Moose. Classic flapping fish were included alongside raccoons or weasels who would pop out of wooden barrels. After each restaurant closed, the non-robotic mounts were sold at local auctions, yet the locations of the talking moose and buffaloes are unknown, theorized to have found other homes in other game themed restaurants.

References

External links

Companies based in Essex County, New Jersey
Restaurants in New Jersey
Economy of the Northeastern United States
Regional restaurant chains in the United States
Restaurants established in 1996
Restaurants disestablished in 2016
Steakhouses in the United States
Defunct steakhouses in the United States
Defunct restaurant chains in the United States
Defunct restaurants in the United States
1996 establishments in New Jersey
2016 disestablishments in New Jersey
Millburn, New Jersey
Companies that filed for Chapter 11 bankruptcy in 2010
Theme restaurants